Knema pierrei is a species of plant in the family Myristicaceae. It is endemic to Vietnam and was thought to be VUlnerable.  However, according to The Plant List and GBIF, K. peirrei  is a synonym of Knema furfuracea (Hook. f. & Thomson) Warb.

References

pierrei
Endemic flora of Vietnam
Trees of Vietnam
Vulnerable plants
Taxonomy articles created by Polbot